Randall Revelle (April 26, 1941- June 3, 2018) was the third King County Executive, having served from his election in November 1981 until January 1, 1986. He also served on the Seattle City Council from 1974 to 1981.

Revelle received some national attention when shortly after his election the Seattle Post Intelligencer disclosed that Revelle suffered from bipolar disorder. Revelle made no secret of his condition and, he said later, "friends, colleagues and the media" knew about it.
After a close defeat for reelection in 1985, Revelle ran for mayor of Seattle in 1989, finishing third in the primary, ending his attempts at elective office.  

Later, he served as senior vice president of the Washington State Hospital Association (WSHA). While at WSHA, Revelle also led the Washington Coalition for Insurance Parity that successfully advocated for  Washington State's mental health parity law in 2005. Revelle and the coalition convinced the legislature to expand the law in 2007.

Revelle retired from WSHA in 2012. He died on June 3, 2018, and was remembered as "something of a hero in the field of mental health".

References

1941 births
Living people
People with bipolar disorder
Politicians from Seattle
Princeton School of Public and International Affairs alumni
Washington (state) Democrats
Harvard Law School alumni